Chauhaneidae is a family of monogeneans within the order Mazocraeidea. There are currently 17 genera assigned to the family.

Genera 

 Ahpua 
 Allopseudopisthogyne 
 Caniongiella 
 Chauhanea 
 Cotyloatlantica 
 Gemmaecaputia 
 Metopisthogyne 
 Oaxacotyle 
 Opisthogyne 
 Paracaniongiella 
 Paragemmaecaputia 
 Pentatres 
 Pseudochauhanea 
 Pseudomazocraes 
 Pseudopisthogyne 
 Pseudopisthogynopsis 
 Salinacotyle

References 

Platyhelminthes families
Polyopisthocotylea